Peters Creek Township is one of nine townships in Stokes County, North Carolina, United States. The township had a population of 2,053 according to the 2000 census.

Geographically, Peters Creek Township occupies  in northern Stokes County.  The township's northern border is with the state of Virginia.  There are no incorporated municipalities in Peters Creek Township but there are several unincorporated communities, including Lawsonville.

Townships in Stokes County, North Carolina
Townships in North Carolina